Cambodia competed at the 2022 World Games held in Birmingham, United States from 7 to 17 July 2022. Athletes representing Cambodia won two gold medals and the country finished in 31st place in the medal table.

Medalists

Competitors
The following is the list of number of competitors in the Games.

Boules sports 

Cambodia won two gold medals in boules sports.

References

Nations at the 2022 World Games
World Games
World Games